The Annals of Pediatric Surgery is a quarterly peer-reviewed medical journal covering research on pediatric surgery. It was established in October 2005 and is the official journal of the Egyptian Pediatric Surgical Association. The editor-in-chief is  Essam A. Elhalaby Tanta University).

Abstracting and indexing
The journal is abstracted and indexed in Scopus.

References

External links

Online access at African Journals OnLine

Publications established in 2005
Pediatrics journals
Pediatric surgery
Surgery journals
Quarterly journals
Lippincott Williams & Wilkins academic journals